The 1990–91 Roller Hockey Champions Cup was the 27th edition of the Roller Hockey Champions Cup organized by CERH.

Barcelos achieved their first title ever.

Teams
The champions of the main European leagues and Porto, as title holder, played this competition, consisting in a double-legged knockout tournament.

Bracket

Source:

References

External links
 CERH website

1990 in roller hockey
1991 in roller hockey
Rink Hockey Euroleague